Dorris Alexander "Dee" Brown (February 29, 1908 – December 12, 2002) was an American novelist, historian, and librarian. His most famous work, Bury My Heart at Wounded Knee (1970), details the history of the United States' westward colonization of the continent between 1830 and 1890 from the point of view of Native Americans.

Personal life 

Born in Alberta, Louisiana, a sawmill town, Brown grew up in Ouachita County, Arkansas, which experienced an oil boom when he was thirteen years old. Brown's mother later relocated to Little Rock so he and his brother and two sisters could attend a better high school. He spent much time in the public library reading the three-volume History of the Expedition under the Command of Captains Lewis and Clark which saw him develop an interest in the American West. He also discovered the works of Sherwood Anderson and John Dos Passos, and later William Faulkner and Joseph Conrad. He cited these authors as those most influential on his own work.

While attending home games by the baseball team the Arkansas Travelers, he became acquainted with Chief Yellow Horse, a pitcher. His kindness, and a childhood friendship with a Creek boy, caused Brown to reject the descriptions of Native American peoples as violent and primitive, which dominated American popular culture at the time.

He worked as a printer and reporter in Harrison, Arkansas, and decided to continue his education at Arkansas State Teachers College in Conway, Arkansas. His mentor, the history professor Dean D. McBrien, helped give him the idea to become a writer. They traveled west along with other students on two occasions in a Model T Ford. On campus, Brown worked as an editor to the student newspaper and was a student assistant in the library. The latter convinced him that he should become a librarian.

In the midst of the Great Depression he went to George Washington University in Washington, D.C. for graduate study. Brown worked part-time for J. Willard Marriott, attended classes, and married Sally Stroud (another graduate of Arkansas State Teachers College drawn to Washington by the New Deal). Eventually he found a full-time job and became a librarian for the U.S. Department of Agriculture from 1934 to 1942. He lived at 1717 R Street NW, in the Dupont Circle neighborhood.

Brown's first novel was a satire of New Deal bureaucracy, but it was not published, owing to the bombing of Pearl Harbor. The publisher suggested "something patriotic" instead. He responded with Wave High The Banner, a fictionalized account of the life of Davy Crockett (who was an acquaintance of his great-grandfather). A few months after its publication, he was drafted into the U.S. Army where he met Martin Schmitt, with whom he collaborated on several works after the war. During the war, Brown worked for the United States Department of War as a librarian and never went overseas.

From 1948 to 1972, he was an agriculture librarian at the University of Illinois at Urbana–Champaign, where he had gained a master's degree in library science, became a professor, and raised a son, Mitchell, and daughter, Linda, with his wife Sally.

As a part-time writer, he published nine books, three fiction and six nonfiction, by the end of the 1950s. During the 1960s, he completed eight more including The Galvanized Yankees, which Brown described as requiring more research than any of his other books, and The Year of the Century: 1876, which he described as his personal favorite.

During 1971, his book Bury My Heart at Wounded Knee became a best-seller. Many readers assumed that Brown was of Native American heritage.

During 1973, Brown and his wife retired in Little Rock, Arkansas, where he devoted his time to writing. His later works include Creek Mary's Blood, a novel telling of several generations of a family descended from one Creek woman, and Hear That Lonesome Whistle Blow, which described the chicanery and romance concerning the construction of the western railroads. His last book-length work, The Way To Bright Star is a picaresque novel set during the Civil War. He never completed its sequel, which was to feature P. T. Barnum and Abraham Lincoln.

Brown died at the age of 94 in Little Rock, Arkansas. His remains are interred in Urbana, Illinois, along with those of his wife.

Legacy and honors 

The Central Arkansas Library System named a branch library in Little Rock, Arkansas for him.

Works

Histories
 Fighting Indians of the West (1948) with Martin F. Schmitt
 Trail Driving Days (1952) with Martin F. Schmitt
 Grierson's Raid (1954) Describes a Union foray into Confederate territory
 Settlers' West (1955) with Martin F. Schmitt
 The Gentle Tamers: Women of the Old Wild West (1958)
 The Bold Cavaliers: Morgan's Second Kentucky Cavalry Raiders (1959) Republished as Morgan's Raiders (1995). Describes John Hunt Morgan's Civil War activities.
 The Fetterman Massacre (1962)
 The Galvanized Yankees (1963) Republished (1986)
 Showdown at Little Big Horn (1964)
 The Year of the Century: 1876 (1966)
 Bury My Heart at Wounded Knee (1970)
 Fort Phil Kearny: An American Saga (1971) Republished as The Fetterman Massacre (1974) (First published 1962)
 Andrew Jackson and the Battle of New Orleans (1972)
 The Westerners (1974)
 Hear That Lonesome Whistle Blow (1977)—about the Union Pacific Railroad
 Wondrous Times on the Frontier (1991)
 The American West (1994) Collected excerpts from earlier books co-authored by Schmitt
 Great Documents in American Indian History (1995)

Novels
 Wave High The Banner (1942)
 Yellowhorse (1956)
 Cavalry Scout (1958)
 They Went Thataway (1960) republished as Pardon My Pandemonium (1984)
 The Girl from Fort Wicked (1964)
 Action at Beecher Island (1967)
 Creek Mary’s Blood (1980)
 Killdeer Mountain (1983) A mystery revolving around an officer in the Battle of Killdeer Mountain
 Conspiracy of Knaves (1986) A Civil War historical saga about the Northwest Conspiracy
 The Way To Bright Star (1998)

Other
 Tales of the Warrior Ants (1973) For young people
 American Spa: Hot Springs, Arkansas (1982) An illustrated history
 Dee Brown's Folktales of the Native American: Retold for Our Times (1993) Originally published as Teepee Tales (1979)
 When the Century Was Young (1993) Memories of growing up in 1920s & 1930s
 Images of the Old West (1996)

References

Further reading 
 Maureen Salzer: Dee Brown. In: Michael D. Sharp (Hrsg.): Popular Contemporary Writers. Marshall Cavendish, 2005, pp. 264-724
 Lyman B. Hagen: Dee Brown. State University, Boise 1990,  (englisch).
 Washington Post Saturday, December 14, 2002
 Contemporary Authors, Autobiography Series, Adele Sarkissian, ed. Vol. 6. Detroit: Gale Research Co., 1988: 45–59.

External links 

 Dee Brown at WorldCat
 Dee Brown, 94. Author Who Revised Image of West New York Times, December 14, 2002
 Dee Brown, 94; 'Wounded Knee' Author Altered Perceptions of Frontier History. Los Angeles Times, 2002-12-14 (obituary)

1908 births
2002 deaths
20th-century American novelists
American librarians
20th-century American historians
Writers from Arkansas
University of Illinois School of Information Sciences alumni
People from Ouachita County, Arkansas
American male novelists
20th-century American male writers
American male non-fiction writers
People from Dupont Circle
George Washington University alumni